Graham Jones may refer to:

Graham Jones (rugby league), rugby league footballer of the 1950s for Wales and Salford
Graham Jones (footballer, born 1949), Welsh footballer
Graham Jones (cyclist) (born 1957), English cyclist
Graham Jones (English footballer) (born 1957), English association football player
Graham Jones (Australian footballer) (born 1960), Australian rules football player
Graham Jones (musician) (born 1961), English guitarist in Haircut 100
Graham Jones (speedway rider) (born 1963), British speedway rider
Graham Jones (politician) (born 1966), British MP for Hyndburn
Graham Jones (director) (born 1973), Irish filmmaker
Graham Jones (Castlevania), fictional character, main antagonist in the video game Castlevania: Aria of Sorrow

See also
Graeme Jones (born 1970), footballer
Wyn Jones (police officer) (Graham Wyn Jones, born c. 1943), British police officer, Assistant Commissioner of the Metropolitan Police